Roderick William George "Rodaidh" McDonald is a Scottish record producer and record company executive. He was born in Edinburgh, Scotland and currently resides in Los Angeles, California, United States. His production and mixing credits include The xx, King Krule, Adele, Sampha,  Daughter, Savages, The Horrors, Bobby Womack, Vampire Weekend, Hot Chip, and Gil Scott-Heron.

Career

Early career 
In 2008, McDonald organised Italo disco club nights in London under the 'Cocadisco' brand.

XL Recordings
Between 2009 and 2019, McDonald worked with XL Recordings, operating as A&R as well as overseeing activities in XL Studios, the label's in-house recording studio. He has worked at XL Studios with a number of acts including The xx, Adele, Sampha, Jai Paul, The Horrors, Bobby Womack, Vampire Weekend, Gil Scott-Heron, and Giggs.
 He also signed artists including King Krule and Powell.

Production
McDonald’s production is found across multiple genres and styles, both on and outside of XL.

In 2009, McDonald recorded and mixed The xx's multi-platinum album xx which won the Mercury Music Prize in 2010.

In 2010, McDonald visited Ethiopia with Richard Russell and Nick Zinner. They subsequently released an EP together under the name Fresh Touch.

In 2011, McDonald participated as a producer in Damon Albarn DRC Music project. Collaborating with producers Dan the Automator, XL Recordings, Richard Russell, Jneiro Jarel, Actress, Marc Antoine, Alwest, Remi Kabaka Jr., Totally Enormous Extinct Dinosaurs and Kwes, McDonald went to Kinshasa in DR Congo for one week to record an album called Kinshasa One Two. All proceeds will benefit Oxfam's work in the DRC. The album was released by Warp Records.

In 2012, he continued his relationship with The xx, mixing the band's second album Coexist with Jamie Smith. On 16 September 2012, Coexist entered the UK Albums Chart at number one.

In 2013, McDonald contributed production to albums by Daughter, King Krule, Savages, and Willis Earl Beal amongst others. Savages' album Silence Yourself, was shortlisted for the 2013 Mercury Music Prize.

In an interview with Dazed and Confused in June 2014, McDonald confirmed he was working on a third xx album in New York, Texas, and Iceland. He also confirmed he was working on the debut album for Sampha, as well as UK singer Denai Moore.

On 20 January 2017, I See You by The xx, which was co-produced by McDonald and Jamie Smith, entered the UK Albums Chart at number one. I See You also entered at number one in Australia, Belgium, Germany, Ireland, Portugal, and the Netherlands. In the United States it gained the number 1 position in the sales chart and number 2 in the Billboard 200. In July 2017, it was announced that both I See You and Sampha’s debut, Process, also co-produced by McDonald, had both been nominated for the 2017 Mercury Music Prize, with Process winning the prize in September 2017.

The same year also saw McDonald shortlisted as Producer Of The Year at the 2017 A&R Awards.

A further US No.1 album came in March 2018 when David Byrne's American Utopia, produced by McDonald, Byrne, and Brian Eno, debuted at No.1 in the US Top Album chart and No.3 in The Billboard 200. American Utopia was nominated for 'Best Alternative Music Album' in the 2019 Grammy Awards.

Discography

Soundtracks

References

External links
 
 Rodaidh McDonald on Discogs.com

Businesspeople from Edinburgh
Scottish record producers
Living people
Scottish businesspeople
Year of birth missing (living people)